Lindenstraße (literally "Linden Street") was a long-running German television drama series, broadcast by Das Erste. The first episode aired on 8 December 1985 and since then new episodes were broadcast weekly until 2020. Its last timeslot on Das Erste was Sundays at 18:50. The events of the Sunday episode usually take place on the Thursday before the show. This is a result of the original plan having been to show each episode on a Thursday night. Before the start of the series the programme's timeslot was switched to Sunday evening, but Thursday remained the day on which the events are normally shown as taking place, because the original concept of dramatizing the events of daily life as experienced by a group of characters on an ordinary weekday has continued unchanged. Exceptions are the so-called holiday episodes where the events take place on such special occasions as Christmas and Easter; also on important election days (especially general elections to the German Bundestag).

Setting the pace for other soap operas in Germany, the first episodes were mostly met with poor reviews. However, Lindenstraße soon became one of the most successful shows on German television.

On 16 November 2018 it was announced that the ARD television programme conference had decided – on cost grounds, despite the programme's continuing to attract between two and three million viewers weekly – not to extend its contract with the show's producers, Geißendörfer Film- und Fernsehproduktion, and that the series would therefore come to an end, after 35 years, in March 2020.

Development 

The creator of Lindenstraße is Hans W. Geißendörfer, whose company Geißendörfer Film- und Fernsehproduktion GmbH (GFF - "Geißendörfer film and TV productions") still produces the series today. In the beginning, Geißendörfer also directed the series. It is set in Munich, but filmed at the WDR studios in Cologne-Bocklemünd, where an entire outdoor street mock-up of the eponymous Lindenstraße was built. An actual street named 'Lindenstraße' exists in Munich's Harlaching district, but it has nothing to do with the series' fictional street.

The show is based on the long-running British soap Coronation Street, from which it borrows its main premise (the everyday life of a number of neighbours). It tackles topics such as racism, cancer, AIDS, Alzheimer's disease, disabilities (both physical and mental), and homosexuality. In 1987, it gained attention for showing the first gay kiss on German television. The show is also known for its prompt incorporation of real-life events and current topics.

United States television actor Larry Hagman made a cameo appearance on Lindenstraße on 19 February 2006.

Geißendörfer wrote and directed the first 31 episodes himself. Now, there are different directors that take turns in about 10-episode blocks. The current directors are Herwig Fischer, Kerstin Krause, Dominikus Probst and Iain Dilthey.

There have been many different writers of the show throughout the years. Currently, three authors share the responsibility of writing the episodes: Michael Meisheit, who has been writing for Lindenstraße since 1997, and Irene Fischer, who has been writing for Lindenstraße since 1999. She has also been playing a main character in the series since 1987. In 2013, Geißendörfer's daughter Hana Geißendörfer joined the team and the first episodes written by her aired in late April.

Setting 
The series is set in the Lindenstraße, a fictional street in Munich. The resident families Beimer-Schiller, Beimer-Ziegler and Zenker, as well as couples without children and communes are very prominent characters in the show. There is also a doctor's office, currently run by Dr. Iris Brooks. In the past, it has been run by Dr. Ernesto Stadler, Dr. Carsten Flöter and his stepfather Dr. Ludwig Dressler. There is also a Greek restaurant "Akropolis" and a supermarket.

There are also a few shops in the Kastanienstraße (literally "Chestnut Street"), which is at one end of the Lindenstraße. There is an organic food shop called "1 A Bio" (It used to be the chocolate store "Kakao" and the gourmet food shop called "Alimentari". There is also a café called "Café Bayer" and a travel agency called "Träwel und Iwends" (a pun on the German pronunciation of Travel and Events) as well as the car shop "Die Werkstatt". There are also several minor characters who live on this street.

On the other end of the Lindenstraße, one can find the Ulrike-Böss-Straße. In it is a movie theater ("Astor"), the "Café George" and a hair salon.

Cast 

Due to the frequency of social problem topics treated in the series, a high proportion of the characters come from minority groups of diverse kind or live in patchwork relationships. From the Greek Restaurant with its family and a Vietnamese which were there from the beginning, characters and whole families with migration background have come and gone from Italy, Turkey, Eastern Europe etc. The current cast counts three male homosexuals, two of them living in marriage with an adopted son, and one female homosexual with a test-tube baby. There's a homeless man, a man in a wheelchair, a child with Down syndrome and so on.

Fans of the series have proclaimed in mild jest that a "normal" family wouldn't survive the Lindenstraße. As if to prove this, the model bavarian family Stadler which moved to the street in September 2008 has only one member, the contrarian Grandfather, remaining in the street as of early 2013. He "occupies" a room in a commune otherwise populated by twens. His son, the family father, fled the street after the family mother had a love-affair with his brother. The mother then broke up with the brother and started a new affair with a young immigrant from the Balkans who hid his visa-less family in an apartment in the same house. The younger family daughter, who became a teenage mother after a Lindenstraße resident of her age purposely broke a condom, fell in love with the same immigrant and left the street in shock after finding out that he preferred her mother over herself. The mother and the immigrant then left the street together. The older teenage daughter had more luck and married a widely liked Lindenstraße resident in Las Vegas with whom she started a successful business in the street, only to suddenly die from a food poisoning originating in the Greek restaurant in February 2013.

Final regular cast members

See also 
 List of soap operas
 Entführung aus der Lindenstraße, a 1995 TV Special featuring many Lindenstraße cast members.

References

External links 
 Official website of the show
 
Lindenstraße-Spoiler

1985 German television series debuts
German television soap operas
Das Erste original programming
Fictional streets and roads
Television shows set in Munich
1990s German television series
2000s German television series
2010s German television series
German-language television shows
Television shows adapted into comics
2020 German television series endings